Talkhab-e Dishmuk (also Romanized as Talkhāb-e Dīshmūk; also known as Moḩammad Rashīd, Talkh Āb-e Pā’īn, and Talkhāb-e Soflá) is a village in Bahmayi-ye Sarhadi-ye Sharqi Rural District, Dishmok District, Kohgiluyeh County, Kohgiluyeh and Boyer-Ahmad Province, Iran. At the 2006 census, its population was 26, in 4 families.

References 

Populated places in Kohgiluyeh County